Murshed Kamal (died 14 January 2013) was a Jatiya Party (Ershad) politician and a Jatiya Sangsad member representing the Brahmanbaria-1 constituency.

Career
Kamal was elected to parliament from Brahmanbaria-1 as a Jatiya Party candidate in 1991. He has since joined Bangladesh Nationalist Party.

References

2013 deaths
Jatiya Party politicians
Bangladesh Nationalist Party politicians
5th Jatiya Sangsad members
Date of birth missing